Arena Corner is an arcuate (curved) nunatak at the north end of the Traverse Mountains,  east of McHugo Peak, on the Rymill Coast, Palmer Land. It was named in 1977 by the UK Antarctic Place-Names Committee, the name being descriptive of the shape of this feature, which serves as a landmark in the area.

References 

Nunataks of Palmer Land